Operation Ivy was the eighth series of American nuclear tests, coming after Tumbler-Snapper and before Upshot–Knothole. The two explosions were staged in late 1952 at Enewetak Atoll in the Pacific Proving Ground in the Marshall Islands.

Background 
The Operation Ivy test series was the first to involve a hydrogen bomb rather than an atomic bomb, further to the order of President Harry S. Truman made on January 31, 1950 that the US should continue research into all forms of nuclear weapons. The bombs were prepared by the US Atomic Energy Commission and  Defense Department aboard naval vessels, and were capable of being detonated remotely from the control ship Estes.

Tests

Mike 
The first Ivy shot, codenamed Mike, was the first successful full-scale test of a multi-megaton thermonuclear weapon ("hydrogen bomb") using the Teller-Ulam design. Unlike later thermonuclear weapons, Mike used deuterium as its fusion fuel, maintained as a liquid by an expensive and cumbersome cryogenic system. The bomb was launched on November 1, 1952 and detonated on Elugelab Island yielding 10.4 megatons, almost 500 times the yield of the bomb dropped on Nagasaki, resulting in the total vaporization of the island. Eight megatons of the yield was from fast fission of the uranium tamper, creating massive amounts of radioactive fallout. The detonation left an underwater crater 6,240 ft (1.9 km) wide and 164 ft (50 m) deep where Elugelab Island had been. Following this successful test, the Mike design was weaponized as the EC-16, but it was quickly abandoned for solid-fueled designs after the success of the Castle Bravo shot.

The outcome of the test was reported to incoming president Eisenhower by Atomic Energy Commission Chairman, Gordon Dean, as follows: “The island of Elugelab is missing!”

Sampling mission
Four  USAF F-84G Thunderjets equipped with filters were flown through the mushroom cloud's stem to collect radiochemical samples for analysis. "Red Flight" Leader Virgil Meroney of the nascent 1211th Test Squadron flew into the stem of the explosion first. In five minutes, he had gathered all the samples he could, and exited. Jimmy Priestly Robinson, age 28, a captain with the 561st Fighter-Day Squadron, was lost near the end of his mission. After re-emerging from the cloud, both he and his wingman, pilot Captain Bob Hagan, encountered difficulties picking up rendezvous and runway navigational beacons due to "electromagnetic after effects" of the detonation. Robinson hit an area of severe turbulence, spinning out and barely retaining consciousness. He regained control of his plane at 20,000 feet, but the electromagnetic storm had disrupted his instruments. In rain and poor visibility, without working instruments, Hagan and Robinson were unable to find the KB-29 tanker aircraft to refuel.  By the time they were successful in finding the signal, they were dangerously low on fuel, and before reaching the runway on Enewetak, both had depleted their reserves. While Hagan was able to glide and made an extraordinary successful dead-stick landing on the runway, Robinson was instead too far out to follow the same path and therefore attempted to land on water. Robinson's jet crashed and sank 3.5 miles short of the island. Robinson's plane flipped and his body was never found. Approximately a year after his disappearance, Robinson was awarded a posthumous Distinguished Flying Cross for his service. In 2002, a memorial stone at Virginia’s Arlington National Cemetery was erected.

As a result of the above collection of samples from the explosion by U.S. Air Force pilots, scientists found traces of the isotopes plutonium-246 and plutonium-244, and confirmed the existence of the predicted but undiscovered elements einsteinium and fermium.

King 
The second test, King, fired the highest-yield (500 kilotons) nuclear fission (A-bomb) weapon to date using only nuclear fission (no fusion nor fusion boosting). This test used an unretarded free-fall bomb from a B-36 bomber. The bomber suffered minor heat and blast damage and safely returned to base. This "Super Oralloy Bomb" was intended as a backup to the earlier "Mike" test, if the fusion weapon had failed. King yielded 540 kilotons, 25 times more powerful than the Fat Man weapon.

Summary

Gallery

References

External links

 Curtiss Atomic Marines
 Operation Ivy
 Analysis of Radiation Exposure for Navy Personnel at Operation Ivy
  formerly classified
  formerly unclassified, for civil defense

Explosions in 1952
Ivy
1952 in the United States
1952 in Oceania
1952 in military history